Codice rosso (Code Red) is an Italian television series produced in 2006 and broadcast on Canale 5 between 16 November and 15 December 2006.

The series deals with the adventures of team 15A of the Vigili del Fuoco.

Cast 
Alessandro Gassman: Pietro Vega
Pietro Taricone: Fausto Rossi
Claudio Gioè: Ivan Amidei
Ilaria Spada: Stella Sandri
Silvio Laviano: Rocco Parrino
Antonello Fassari: Fulvio Torri
Paolo Sassanelli: Siddharta
Paolo Serra: Magrelli
Lino Damiani:
Maud Buquet: Aisha
Anna Melato: Adele Nistri
Michele Venitucci: Bruno Nistri

See also
List of Italian television series

External links
 

2006 Italian television series debuts
2006 Italian television series endings
Italian television series
2000s Italian television series
Canale 5 original programming